Doddsville is an unincorporated community in McDonough County, in the U.S. state of Illinois.

History
Doddsville was laid out in the 1830s by Samuel Dodds, and named for him. A post office was called Doddsville was established in 1839, and remained in operation until 1903.

References

Unincorporated communities in McDonough County, Illinois
Unincorporated communities in Illinois